UFC Fight Night: Grasso vs. Araújo (also known as UFC Fight Night 212, UFC on ESPN+ 70, and UFC Vegas 62) was a mixed martial arts event produced by the Ultimate Fighting Championship that took place on October 15, 2022, at the UFC Apex facility in Enterprise, Nevada, part of the Las Vegas Metropolitan Area, United States.

Background
The event was originally expected to be headlined by a middleweight bout between former UFC Middleweight Championship challenger Jared Cannonier and Sean Strickland. However, the bout was scrapped after Strickland withdrew due to a finger infection. They are now expected to headline an event on December 17.

A women's flyweight bout between Viviane Araújo and Alexa Grasso took place at this event. The pairing was previously scheduled for August 13, 2022 at UFC on ESPN 41.  However, Grasso pulled out due to visa issues which restricted her travel and the bout was scrapped. The pair was also previously scheduled to meet at UFC 270, but Araújo pulled out from that event due to injury. They were elevated to main event status in early September after the cancellation of the original headliner.

Melsik Baghdasaryan was expected to face Joanderson Brito in a featherweight bout. However, Baghdasaryan pulled out in late September due to a broken hand. He was replaced by promotional newcomer Lucas Alexander.

A welterweight bout between Neil Magny and Daniel Rodriguez was scheduled for the event. However, Rodriguez withdrew from the bout due to an elbow infection. They were rescheduled for UFC Fight Night: Rodriguez vs. Lemos on November 5.

Askar Askarov and Brandon Royval were expected to meet in a flyweight bout. In turn, it was cancelled a day before the event due to weight cut issues related to Askarov.

At the weigh-ins, C.J. Vergara weighed in at 129 pounds, three pounds over the flyweight non-title fight limit. The bout proceeded at catchweight with Vergara being fined 30% of his purse, which went to his opponent Tatsuro Taira.

Results

Bonus awards
The following fighters received $50,000 bonuses.
Fight of the Night: Duško Todorović vs. Jordan Wright
Performance of the Night: Jonathan Martinez and Tatsuro Taira

See also 

 List of UFC events
 List of current UFC fighters
 2022 in UFC

References 

UFC Fight Night
2022 in mixed martial arts
October 2022 sports events in the United States
2022 in sports in Nevada
Mixed martial arts in Las Vegas
Sports competitions in Las Vegas